Love in the Wilderness is a 1920 British silent drama film directed by Alexander Butler and starring Madge Titheradge, C. M. Hallard and Campbell Gullan. It was adapted from Gertrude Page's 1907 novel Love in the Wilderness. The film is a romantic melodrama, set partly on a farm in Southern Rhodesia. The film was shot in California.

Cast
 Madge Titheradge as Enid Davenport 
 C. M. Hallard as Keith Meredith 
 Campbell Gullan as Hon. Dicky Byrd 
 Maudie Dunham as Nancy Johnson 
 Hubert Davies as George Whiting 
 Frances Griffiths as Marion Davenport 
 Lenore Lynard as Mrs. Meredith

References

Bibliography
 Bamford, Kenton. Distorted Images: British National Identity and Film in the 1920s. I.B. Tauris, 1999.
 Low, Rachael. History of the British Film, 1918-1929. George Allen & Unwin, 1971.

External links

1920 films
1920 drama films
British drama films
British silent feature films
Films directed by Alexander Butler
Films based on British novels
Films set in Rhodesia
Films set in England
Films shot in the United States
British black-and-white films
1920s English-language films
1920s British films
Silent drama films